In Our Time is a 1944 American romantic drama film set in the days leading up to World War II. It stars Ida Lupino and Paul Henreid.

Plot
In March 1939, English antiques dealer Mrs. Bromley and her assistant Jennifer "Jenny" Whittredge travel through Poland making purchases. In Warsaw, Jenny meets Count Stefan Orwid and, after a whirlwind courtship, he asks her to marry him.

However, Stefan's aristocratic family is less than welcoming to the English commoner, particularly his sister Janina and his wealthy, diplomat uncle Count Pawel Orwid. His mother Zofyia merely wants to keep peace in the family. Only his other uncle, ineffectual Leopold Baruta, welcomes her. Nonetheless, the wedding takes place.

Afterwards, Jenny encourages Stefan to break his family's dependence on Count Pawel's financial aid by persuading his peasant tenants to adopt more modern and efficient farming methods. It works; the harvest is bountiful, and Stefan accepts Jenny's suggestion that they invite the workers to a celebration party in his mansion. Count Pawel makes a surprise visit to express his strong disapproval of Jenny's democratic ideas. However, they are interrupted by the bombing of nearby Warsaw. War has broken out, despite Count Pawel's desperate attempts to placate Nazi Germany.

Stefan joins his Polish Army cavalry regiment, leaving Jenny to supervise the rest of the harvest. Days go by with conflicting radio reports. Finally, a dazed, wounded Stefan returns to the estate. His regiment was wiped out after charging tanks. He gathers the peasants and asks them to burn the crop and anything else that could be of use to the invaders. They patriotically agree. Count Pawel shows up to take the family to Romania. Stefan, Jenny, and Leopold remain behind to fight.

Controversy
The movie presents a vision of Poland before and during September 1939 campaign that was a propagandistic assault on the country. Mieczysław B. Biskupski describes it as "piece of historical rubbish", which claims that despite everything West had done, the war is essentially Poland's fault. The country is presented as being based on "meaningless symbols based on a distant past" with questionable patriotism; serfdom is still present (in reality, is was abolished in 19th century), and majority of Poles are pro-German, pro-Nazi, and depicted as sinister. The film also follows the myth that Polish cavalry had conducted charges on German tanks.

In the first versions of script, the opening montage was to present map of Poland from 16th century, which then would be burned down; afterwards, the map with Second Polish Republic was planned to appear. In Biskupski's words, this was supposed to show that previous downfall of Poland was only the country's fault, while carefully omitting Russia's role.

There are also doubts about the crew. Screewriter Howard Koch had close ties with CPSU, and was probably its member in the 1930s. Director Vincent Sherman claimed that he had read about Polish history, but described it as "South before the Civil War", thinking that peasants were carrying landed gentry and large estates. Biskupski also notes, that Daily Worker praised the movie, calling every forces loyal to Polish government-in-exile "reactionary".

Cast
 Ida Lupino as Jennifer Whittredge
 Paul Henreid as Count Stefan Orwid
 Nancy Coleman as Janina Orwid
 Mary Boland as Mrs. Bromley
 Victor Francen as Count Pawel Orwid
 Alla Nazimova as Zofia Orwid (as Nazimova)
 Michael Chekhov as Uncle Leopold Baruta
 Cyd Charisse as Ballerina

See also
 List of American films of 1944

References

External links
 
 
 
 

1944 romantic drama films
1944 films
American World War II propaganda films
American romantic drama films
American black-and-white films
Films scored by Franz Waxman
Films directed by Vincent Sherman
Warner Bros. films
Films set in 1939
Eastern Front of World War II films
Films about nobility
Films set in Poland
Films set in Warsaw
1940s English-language films